Alexei Soloviev is a Soviet former ice dancer. He is a two-time (1980, 1981) World Junior champion with partner Elena Batanova. On the senior level, they won the 1982 NHK Trophy and 1984 Soviet national title. They were coached by Lyudmila Pakhomova and later Tatiana Tarasova.

Results with Batanova

References

Navigation

Soviet male ice dancers
Living people
World Junior Figure Skating Championships medalists
Year of birth missing (living people)